is a Japanese fencer. He competed in the individual foil, épée, and sabre events at the 1956 Summer Olympics.

References

External links
 

1919 births
Possibly living people
Japanese male épée fencers
Olympic fencers of Japan
Fencers at the 1956 Summer Olympics
Japanese male foil fencers
Japanese male sabre fencers